Klub Hokeja na Ledu Zagreb, commonly referred to as KHL Zagreb or simply Zagreb, is a Croatian ice hockey team that plays in the Croatian Ice Hockey League and formerly in the Panonian League. The club played in the IIHF European Champions Cup in 1993, 1994, 1995 and 1997, 2020 reaching first round.

Honours
 Croatian Ice Hockey League
Winners (5): 1992, 1993, 1994, 1996, 2019

External links
Official website 

Ice hockey teams in Croatia
Ice hockey clubs established in 1982
Croatian Ice Hockey League teams
Yugoslav Ice Hockey League teams
Panonian League teams
Interliga (1999–2007) teams
1982 establishments in Yugoslavia
Slovenian Ice Hockey League teams